Animals is a 1998 American fantasy romance film written and directed by Michael Di Jiacomo in his directorial debut, and starring Tim Roth, Mili Avital and John Turturro.

Cast
Tim Roth as Henry
Mili Avital as Fatima
Rod Steiger as Fontina
Barbara Bain as The Mother
John Turturro as Tuxedo Man
Mickey Rooney as Tollkeeper
Lothaire Bluteau as Young Laurent
Jacques Herlin as Laurent
O-Lan Jones as Essie

Production
Filming occurred in South Carolina in March 1997.  The opening black-and-white 13-minute segment The Tollkeeper was shot in December 1996 in Utah.

Reception
The Mail & Guardian gave the film a positive review: "Di Jiacomo’s screenplay for Animals blurs the levels of accepted reality and the magical, and while this may reveal a fascination with magical realism that is now becoming popular in films, its use here makes for an imaginatively coloured, whimsical story that even manages to pack a startling ending."

References

External links
 
 

1998 films
1990s English-language films
1998 directorial debut films